Joseph Patrick Norton (26 February 1888 – 1972) was an English professional footballer who played as an outside forward in the Football League for Stockport County, Manchester United, Leicester City, Bristol Rovers and Swindon Town.

Personal life 
During the First World War, Norton served as a private in the Leicester Town Rifles, which fought as part of the 46th (North Midland) Division.

Career statistics

References

External links
MUFCInfo.com profile

1888 births
1972 deaths
Footballers from Leicester
English footballers
Association football forwards
Stockport County F.C. players
Atherstone Town F.C. players
Nuneaton Borough F.C. players
Leicester City F.C. players
Manchester United F.C. players
Bristol Rovers F.C. players
Swindon Town F.C. players
Kettering Town F.C. players
Hinckley Town F.C. players
Ashby Town F.C. players
English Football League players
People from Stoney Stanton
Footballers from Leicestershire
Nottingham Forest F.C. wartime guest players
Leicester City F.C. wartime guest players
British Army personnel of World War I
Royal Leicestershire Regiment soldiers
Military personnel from Leicestershire